The Red Book of the Peoples of the Russian Empire is a book about the small nations of the Russian Empire, the Soviet Union, and Russia and some other post-Soviet states of today.  It was published in Estonian in 1991 and in English in 2001.

The foreword of the book explains the book's approach by saying, "the authors of the present book, who come from a country (Estonia) which has shared the fate of nations in the Russian and Soviet empires, endeavour to publicize the plight of the small nations whose very existence is threatened as a result of recent history."

Described peoples
The authors' intention for the book was to include the peoples according to the following criteria:

 are not yet extinct,
 whose main area of settlement is on ex-Soviet territory,
 whose numbers are below 30,000,
 of whom less than 70% speak their native language,
 who form a minority on their ancient territory,
 whose settlement is scattered rather than compact,
 who have no vernacular school, literature or media.

(The names are given in the spelling of the original translation of the book.)
Abazians (Abaza) – Abkhaz – Aguls – Akhvakhs – Aleuts – Altaics – Aliutors – Andis – Archis – Asiatic Eskimos
Bagulals – Baraba Tatars – Bartangs – Bats – Bezhtas – Botlikhs – Budukhs
Central Asian Jews – Chamalals – Chukchis – Chulym Tatars – Crimean Jews – Crimean Tatars
Didos (Tsez) – Dolgans
Enets – Evens – Evenks
Georgian Jews – Godoberis
Hinukhs – Hunzibs
Ingrians – Ishkashmis – Itelmens – Izhorians
Kamas – Karaims – Karatas – Karelians – Kereks – Kets – Khakass – Khants – Khinalugs – Khufis – Khwarshis – Kola Lapps – Koryaks – Kryts – Kurds
Lithuanian Tatars – Livonians
Mansis – Mountain Jews
Nanais – Negidals – Nenets – Nganasans – Nivkhs – Nogays
Orochis – Oroks – Oroshoris
Peoples of the Pamirs
Roshanis – Rutuls
Selkups – Shors – Shughnis
Tabasarans – Talysh – Tats (Tatians) – Tindis – Tofalars – Trukhmens (Turkhmens) – Tsakhurs
Udeghes – Udis – Ulchis
Veps – Votes
Wakhs
Yaghnabis – Yazgulamis – Yukaghirs

References
 The Red Book of the Peoples of the Russian Empire, NGO Red Book, 

Encyclopedias of culture and ethnicity
Red Book of the Peoples of the Russian Empire
Ethnic groups in Russia